ONE Friday Fights 4: Duangsompong vs. Batman (also known as ONE Lumpinee 4) was a combat sports event produced by ONE Championship that took place on February 10, 2023, at Lumpinee Boxing Stadium in Bangkok, Thailand.

Background
A flyweight muay thai bout between Batman Or.Atchariya and Duangsompong Jitmuangnon served as the event headliner.

Results

Bonus awards 
The following fighters received $10,000 bonuses.
Performance of the Night: Erdem Taha Dincer, Francisca Vera, Chaongoh Jitmuangnon and Fabio Reis

See also 

 2023 in ONE Championship
 List of ONE Championship events
 List of current ONE fighters

References 

Events in Bangkok
ONE Championship events
2023 in mixed martial arts
Mixed martial arts in Thailand
Sports competitions in Thailand
February 2023 sports events in Thailand